Voltaggio is a surname. Notable people with the surname include:

Bryan Voltaggio (born 1976), American chef
Michael Voltaggio (born 1978), American chef, brother of Bryan
Vic Voltaggio (born 1941), American baseball umpire

See also
Voltaggio
Vultaggio